KINS-FM (106.3 FM) is a radio station broadcasting a news/talk format. Licensed to Blue Lake, California, United States, the station is currently owned by Eureka Broadcasting Co., Inc. and features programming from CBS Radio Network.

References

External links

INS-FM
Mass media in Humboldt County, California